Leif Magnus "Ölme" Johansson (born 10 November 1971) is a Swedish former professional footballer who played as a defender. After playing for IFK Ölme, he joined IFK Göteborg in 1990. He moved to the Dutch club FC Groningen in 1999 before rejoining IFK in 2003. He was a member of the Sweden squad that competed at the 1992 Summer Olympics in Barcelona. He is nicknamed Ölme after his first club. He retired after the 2007 season. Johansson earned 1 cap for Sweden

Honours
IFK Göteborg
Allsvenskan: 1990, 1991, 1993, 1994, 1995, 1996, 2007

References

1971 births
Living people
Swedish footballers
Association football defenders
Sweden international footballers
Olympic footballers of Sweden
Footballers at the 1992 Summer Olympics
Sweden youth international footballers
Sweden under-21 international footballers
Allsvenskan players
Eredivisie players
Eerste Divisie players
IFK Göteborg players
FC Groningen players
Swedish expatriate footballers
Swedish expatriate sportspeople in the Netherlands
Expatriate footballers in the Netherlands